Trout Run is a tributary of East Branch Fishing Creek in Sullivan County, Pennsylvania, in the United States. The stream is acidic and is considered by the Pennsylvania Department of Environmental Protection to be impaired by atmospheric deposition and metals. Rock formations in the watershed include the Catskill Formation and the Huntley Mountain Formation. Soils in the watershed include the Deep-Wellsboro-Oquaga and Oquaga soil associations.

Course

Trout Run begins on a plateau in Davidson Township. It flows west-northwest for a short distance before turning southwest and entering a valley, which it flows through for some distance. At the end of the valley, the stream turns southwest and then south. After a short distance, it reaches its confluence with East Branch Fishing Creek.

Tributaries
Trout Run has no named tributaries. It does, however, have at least one small unnamed tributary.

Hydrology
The average discharge of Trout Run is 930 gallons per minute. It sometimes runs dry. The concentration of aluminum in the stream is 9.9 milligrams per liter during average conditions.

The pH of Trout Run is 5.29 during average conditions. The stream experiences episodic acidification.

Trout Run is considered to have fair water quality. It could potentially improve the water quality of East Branch Fishing Creek, but not significantly. Proposed methods of increasing the alkalinity of Trout Run include road liming. The cost of road liming Trout Run along with the nearby Lead Run is estimated to be $120,000.

Geography and geology

The lower reaches of Trout Run are over rock of the Catskill Formation. The stream's upper reaches lie over the Huntley Mountain Formation.

The lower reaches of Trout Run lie over the Oquaga soil association, although the Deep-Wellsboro-Oquaga soil association also occurs nearby. The upper reaches of the stream have soils of the Oquaga soil association, as well as another soil association. There are also rock outcroppings near the stream. Most of the soil in the watershed is highly acidic.

Watershed

Most of Trout Run is on private land. However, a number of forest trails run parallel to and cross the stream.

History
The restoration of Trout Run, along with Lead Run, is the seventh phase of the East Branch Fishing Creek Restoration Plan. The Pennsylvania Department of Environmental Protection has designated Trout Run to be used for aquatic life. The stream was listed as impaired in 2002. As of December 2011, a total maximum daily load is scheduled for it in 2015.

See also
Blackberry Run
Lead Run
List of tributaries of Fishing Creek (North Branch Susquehanna River)

References

Rivers of Sullivan County, Pennsylvania
Tributaries of Fishing Creek (North Branch Susquehanna River)
Rivers of Pennsylvania